John McBride or John MacBride may refer to:
 
John R. McBride (1832–1904), U.S. Representative from Oregon
John McBride (labor leader) (1854–1917), American labor union leader
John MacBride (1868–1916), Irish republican
John C. McBride (1908–1979), American politician in Wisconsin
John McBride (photographer) (born 1967), American photographer based in New York City
John Paul McBride (born 1978), Scottish footballer
John Evangelist McBride, Irish prelate of the Catholic Church

See also
John McBryde (disambiguation)
McBride (surname)